Hypostomus pospisili is a species of catfish in the family Loricariidae. It is native to South America, where it is known only from Venezuela. The species is believed to be a facultative air-breather. A 2003 taxonomic review conducted by Jonathan W. Armbruster of Auburn University listed Hypostomus pospisili as a synonym of Hypostomus hondae, although multiple sources recognize H. pospisili as a distinct species.

References 

Catfish of South America
pospisili
Fish described in 1944